is a 2011 Japanese comedy horror film directed by Noboru Iguchi and written by Iguchi, Ao Murata and Jun Tsugita from a story by Tadayoshi Kubo. Starring Arisa Nakamura, Asana Mamoru and Mayu Sugano, the plot follows a pretty young karate student (Nakamura) who, following her younger sister's suicide, goes on a camping trip with friends. Their fun is quickly interrupted by the arrival of feces covered zombies.

It had its world premiere at Fantastic Fest film festival in Austin, Texas in September 2011, and was theatrically released in Japan in February 2012.

Synopsis
Wracked with guilt over the suicide of her bullied sister, young karate student Megumi accompanies four older friends on a trip into the woods: smart girl Aya, her druggie boyfriend Také, full-figured model Maki, and nerdy Naoi. Things start to go badly when Maki finds a parasitical worm inside a fish – and eats it down, in the hope that it will keep her skinny. Her stomach later feels horrible and she relieves herself in an outhouse toilet. The parasitic worm she ate had apparently laid eggs in her stomach and came out of her in her diarrhea attack. Soon after, they are attacked by a crowd of feces-covered undead who emerge from the outhouse toilet Maki used.

Cast
 Arisa Nakamura as Megumi 
 Asana Mamoru as Maki 
 Mayu Sugano as Aya 
 Asami as Female Zombie
 Yûki as Ko Tanaka
 Dani as Naoi
 Kentarô Kishi as Tak
 Demo Tanaka as The Shit Zombie
 Sayuri Yajima as Ai
 Kentarô Shimazu as Dr. Tanaka
 Hideki Kurauchi as Hunter
 Takeo Gozu as Hunter

References

External links
  
 
 Cassidy, Kevin, "AFM's 20 Most Outrageous Movie Posters #20: Zombie Ass", The Hollywood Reporter, November 8, 2011. Category: Most Original Attempt to Freshen up a Genre.

2011 films
Films directed by Noboru Iguchi
Zombie comedy films
Japanese horror films
2011 comedy horror films
Mad scientist films
Films about father–daughter relationships
2010s Japanese films